Fabian Weiß (born 23 February 1992) is a German midfield footballer who currently plays for SV Waldhausen 1926.

References

External links

Fabian Weiß at FuPa

1992 births
Living people
German footballers
VfR Aalen players
SG Sonnenhof Großaspach players
Würzburger Kickers players
2. Bundesliga players
3. Liga players
Association football wingers
People from Aalen
Sportspeople from Stuttgart (region)
Footballers from Baden-Württemberg